USS Cheboygan County (LST-533) was an  built for the United States Navy during World War II.  Named for Cheboygan County, Michigan, she has so far been the only U.S. Naval vessel to bear the name.  The name Cheboygan also means "Big Boat".

LST-533 was laid down on 29 September 1943 at Evansville, Indiana, by the Missouri Valley Bridge & Iron Company; launched on 1 December 1943; sponsored by Mrs. H. D. Peoples; and commissioned on 27 January 1944.

Service history
During World War II, LST-533 was assigned to the European Theater. She participated in the Invasion of Normandy. LST-533 departed Trebah near Falmouth Cornwall, United Kingdom on 5 June 1944, transporting units of the 29th Infantry Division.  Following the War, LST-533 performed occupation duty in Europe until early February 1953.  She was named USS Cheboygan County (LST-533) on 1 July 1955.  The ship was decommissioned on 1 December 1955, recommissioned on 18 November 1961, and performed duties for the Service Force, U.S. Atlantic Fleet.  The tank landing ship was again decommissioned in May, 1969, and struck from the Naval Vessel Register on 15 September 1974.  The ship was sold for scrapping 1 December 1975 by the Defense Reutilization and Marketing Service (DRMS). 
 
LST-533 earned one battle star for World War II service.

References

See also
 List of United States Navy LSTs

LST-491-class tank landing ships
World War II amphibious warfare vessels of the United States
Cold War amphibious warfare vessels of the United States
Cheboygan County, Michigan
Ships built in Evansville, Indiana
1943 ships